Goruran-e Chahar Dang (also Romanized as Gorūrān-e Chahār Dāng; also known as Gorūrān-e Chahār Dāngeh) is a village in Miyan Darband Rural District, in the Central District of Kermanshah County, Kermanshah Province, Iran. At the 2006 census, its population was 169, in 39 families.

References 

Populated places in Kermanshah County